Garby  is a village located in Gmina Krzykosy, Środa Wielkopolska County, Greater Poland Voivodeship, Poland.

References

Villages in Środa Wielkopolska County